Chu Prefecture may refer to:

Chu Prefecture (Jiangsu) (楚州), a prefecture between the 6th and 13th centuries in modern Jiangsu, China
Chu Prefecture (Anhui) (滁州), a prefecture between the 7th and 13th centuries in modern Anhui, China
Chu Prefecture (Zhejiang) (處州), a prefecture between the 6th and 13th centuries in modern Zhejiang, China

See also
Chu (disambiguation)